Boy King is the fifth and final studio album by Wild Beasts, released on 5 August 2016 through Domino Records.

Background
Boy King is a concept album dealing with the self-destructive effects of modern-day masculinity. The album has a heavier sound than the band's previous work, featuring distorted synths, compressed drum machine-like beats and guitar solos, marking a big departure from the band's soft yet dramatic art pop sound, which was featured on their past four albums. It was recorded in Dallas, Texas with producer John Congleton, who previously helmed albums by St. Vincent and Swans.

Accolades

Track listing

Charts

References

2016 albums
Wild Beasts albums
Albums produced by John Congleton
Concept albums
Domino Recording Company albums